Vegam may refer to:

Vegam (2006 film)
Vegam (2007 film) - a Tamil film directed by K. R. Udhayashankar starring Ashwin Shekhar and Veda 
Vegam (2013 film) - a Telugu film directed by Ajay Kumar Y starring Karthik and Sruthi Raj 
Vegam (2014 film) - a Malayalam film directed by K. G. Anil Kumar starring Vineeth Kumar and Jacob Gregory